The Pest (a.k.a. The Freeloader) is a 1917 American silent comedy film featuring Oliver Hardy.

Cast
 Billy West as The Pest
 Oliver Hardy (as Babe Hardy)
 Ethelyn Gibson
 Bud Ross as The Bellboy (as Budd Ross)
 Leo White as The Count

See also
 List of American films of 1917
 Oliver Hardy filmography

References

External links

1917 films
1917 short films
1917 comedy films
American silent short films
American black-and-white films
Films directed by Arvid E. Gillstrom
Silent American comedy films
American comedy short films
1910s American films